Red Oak is a city in Ellis County, Texas, United States. It is part of the Dallas–Fort Worth metroplex. The population was 10,769 at the 2010 census, up from 4,301 at the 2000 census. The North Central Texas Council of Governments projects that number to grow to 63,329 by the year 2030, as it is on the verge of explosive suburban growth. Red Oak was one of the exterior locations for filming True Stories, directed by David Byrne of Talking Heads and released in 1986.

History
One of the first settlers to this area was James E. Patton and his family in 1844. They settled in what is now known as Ovilla, Texas, located about two miles from Red Oak. Before Red Oak was given its name in 1849, it was known as Possum Trot due to the animal that lived there. The Missouri, Kansas and Texas Railroad began near the Red Oak area in 1884 and was completed in 1890. This railroad allowed people to travel to Dallas and Waco. In 1949, Red Oak became an incorporated town of Ellis, County.

Geography
Adjacent cities are Glenn Heights to the northwest, Lancaster to the north, Ferris to the east, Pecan Hill to the southeast, Waxahachie to the south, and Oak Leaf to the west.

Climate
The climate in this area is characterized by hot, humid summers and generally mild to cool winters.  According to the Köppen Climate Classification system, Red Oak has a humid subtropical climate, abbreviated "Cfa" on climate maps.

Demographics

As of the 2020 United States census, there were 14,222 people, 4,098 households, and 3,293 families residing in the city.

Education

The city of Red Oak is served by the Red Oak Independent School District: Shields Elementary, Eastridge Elementary, Red Oak Elementary, Wooden Elementary, Russell P Schupmann Elementary, Red Oak Junior High, and Red Oak High School.

In addition Life School, a public charter school, operates the K–12 Red Oak campus.

Texas State Technical College operates a branch campus in Red Oak.

Transportation

Major highways
  Interstate 35E/U.S. Route 77

Air
The city of Red Oak jointly owns the Ferris Red Oak Muni Heliport together with the city of Ferris.

Notable people

 Michelle Carter, gold medal winner in the women's shot put at the 2016 Summer Olympics in Rio de Janeiro
 Pinky Higgins, Major League Baseball player and manager, born in Red Oak
 Sarah Jaffe, singer/songwriter
 Louise Ritter, gold medal winner in the women's high jump at the 1988 Summer Olympics, graduated from Red Oak High School
 Nikki Stringfield, guitarist for American heavy metal band The Iron Maidens

Geographic location

References

External links
 Red Oak official website
 Red Oak ISD
 Red Oak ISD Education Foundation
 Red Oak ISD Bands
 Handbook of Texas Online – Red Oak, TX

Dallas–Fort Worth metroplex
Cities in Ellis County, Texas
Cities in Texas